Rebel City is a 1953 American Western film directed by Thomas Carr and starring Wild Bill Elliott,  Marjorie Lord and Robert Kent. The film is set in Junction City in Kansas during the American Civil War where Southern supporters are attempting to launch an uprising.

Plot

Cast
 Wild Bill Elliott as Frank Graham 
 Marjorie Lord as Jane Dudley  
 Robert Kent as Captain Ramsey  
 Keith Richards as Temple  
 I. Stanford Jolley as Perry  
 Denver Pyle as Greeley  
 Henry Rowland as Hardy  
 John Crawford as Joe Spencer  
 Otto Waldis as Spain - the Jeweler 
 Stanley Price as Herb 
 Ray Walker as Colonel Barnes  
 Michael Vallon as Sam - the Barber  
 Bill Walker as William

References

Bibliography
 Britton, Wesley Alan. Onscreen and Undercover: The Ultimate Book of Movie Espionage. Greenwood Publishing Group, 2006.
 Martin, Len D. The Allied Artists Checklist: The Feature Films and Short Subjects of Allied Artists Pictures Corporation, 1947-1978. McFarland & Company, 1993.

External links
 

1953 films
1953 Western (genre) films
American Western (genre) films
Films directed by Thomas Carr
Allied Artists films
Films set in Kansas
Films set in the 1860s
1950s historical films
American historical films
Films scored by Raoul Kraushaar
American black-and-white films
1950s English-language films
1950s American films